The 1990 Rhode Island Rams football team was an American football team that represented the University of Rhode Island in the Yankee Conference during the 1990 NCAA Division I-AA football season. In their 15th season under head coach Bob Griffin, the Rams compiled a 5–6 record (2–6 against conference opponents) and tied for seventh place out of nine teams in the conference.

Schedule

References

Rhode Island
Rhode Island Rams football seasons
Rhode Island Rams football